Ricardo Aronovich (born January 3, 1930, in Buenos Aires) is an Argentinean cinematographer known for his work for directors such as Hugo Santiago, Costa-Gavras, Ettore Scola and Raúl Ruiz.

Filmography 

 The Guns (1964)
 The Obsessed of Catule (1965)
 Orden de matar (1965)
 Psique y sexo (1965)
 Invasión (1969)
 Murmur of the Heart (1971)
 Dear Louise (1972)
 Plot (1972)
 The Dominici Affair (1973)
 Les autres (1974)
 That Most Important Thing: Love (1975)
 Lumiere (1976)
 Providence (1977)
 The Recourse to the Method (1978)
 Flesh Color (1978)
 Womanlight (1979)
 Écoute voir (1979)
 Christmas Evil (1980)
 Chanel Solitaire (1981)
 Missing (1982)
 Hanna K. (1983)
 Le Bal (1983)
 Les Longs Manteaux (1986)
 The Family (1987)
 I Never Been in Vienna (1989)
 The Man Inside (1990)
 Time Regained (1999)
 Stranded (2001)
 Klimt (2006)
 Moscow Zero (2006)
 A Closed Book (2010)

Awards 

 1965 Candango Trophy for Best Cinematography for Vereda de Salvação        
 1978 César Award for Best Cinematography nominated for Providence 
 1984 César Award for Best Cinematography nominated for Le Bal
 1997 Best Cinematography at the Havana Film Festival for El Impostor
 2001 Career Award at the ABC Cinematography Award
 2012 Golden Unicorn for Career Achievement at the Amiens International Film Festival

References

External links

Living people
Argentine cinematographers
Argentine Jews
1930 births